Crossroads Mall (also known as Plaza Mayor) was a  super regional shopping mall and trade area located in south Oklahoma City, Oklahoma, United States.

History
The Crossroads Mall opened on February 17, 1974, with anchor stores John A. Brown, Dillard's, Montgomery Ward, and JCPenney, with the name chosen because it lies at the major intersection of I-35 and I-240. At the time of its opening, it was one of the largest construction projects ever in Oklahoma, and was also among the ten largest shopping malls in the United States. A 1974 Daily Oklahoman newspaper article described the mall as "the most magnificent enclosed and air-conditioned shopping mall in the Southwest." Before the mall's closure, the mall contained approximately 36 stores and services as well as a large trade zone outside of the mall building with multiple retailers, and restaurants, including two hotels and a movie theater. Crossroads Mall was one of the more popular shopping establishments in the city for well over twenty years and was noted as one of the reasons for the suburban flight of retail shops from Downtown Oklahoma City, something that is beginning to be reversed with an increase of retail shops following the Metropolitan Area Projects Plan.

Decline
Even though it was popular, the mall lacked any substantial renovations or retail growth which, combined with the expansion of shopping centers in Moore and along I-240 west of the mall, contributed to a dramatic decline in the number of shoppers. Crossroads Mall was also situated in an area of increased gang activity which led to an increase in crime and safety issues. Teen loitering had also become a problem to the point that on October 26, 2006, the mall imposed a weekend curfew prohibiting teens younger than 18 years of age from shopping after 6 PM on Fridays and Saturdays unless they were accompanied by a parent or legal guardian in the hope that the mall would become more family friendly.

In 2001 Montgomery Ward closed its doors due to bankruptcy, and throughout the late 2000s, the other three anchor stores followed, among with other small stores, eventually vacated the mall as a result of the 2008 economic downturn and increased gang activity. A few years later, on October 10, 2011, YouTube user miah022 uploaded a video taking a tour of the soon-to-be closed mall, passing vacant anchor stores Dillard's, JCPenney, Macy's and Steve & Barry's, as well as some stores and restaurants that were still open at the time the video was uploaded.

The property was foreclosed on in April 2009 and it fell under the ownership of the Federal Reserve Bank of New York due to the Bear Stearns bailout. The mall was part of a portfolio of Bear Stearns assets, including $5.5 billion in commercial loans, that the Fed used to secure $29 billion to lend to JPMorgan Chase to buy Bear Stearns. According to Price Edwards & Co.’s 2010 Oklahoma City Mid-Year Retail Market Summary report, Crossroads Mall was 75 percent vacant. On September 14, 2011, the mall was purchased by Raptor Properties, LLC for $3.5 million, far below the $24 million asking price, although the sale only included , as several other parts of the property were previously sold to other investors.

Incidents
A young man opened fire on May 27, 2006, injuring a teen before the man was shot and killed by an off-duty sheriff's deputy.

On November 26, 2008, following reports that individuals in a vehicle travelling on Interstate 240 had pulled a gun on the driver of another vehicle, a police helicopter followed the vehicle of the suspected gunmen as it drove into the mall parking lot where one or more suspects exited the vehicle and ran into the entrance of Dillard's.  Police surrounded the mall's entrances and exits and were also able to surround the suspects' vehicle. Two suspects were subsequently arrested, including the alleged gunman Brandon Gunn. A third suspect was detained, but not arrested. The mall was not evacuated and there were no reports of injuries.

Re-branding efforts and closure (2013-2017)
In April 2013, Raptor Properties announced plans to re-brand Crossroads Mall in a similar fashion to the revitalized La Gran Plaza in Fort Worth, Texas by attracting businesses that serve the local Hispanic community. On April 24, 2013, Raptor announced that the new name of the mall would be Plaza Mayor at the Crossroads with future renovations to include space for a grocery store, a nightclub and a rodeo arena seating 3,500 spectators. The mall's entrances and bathrooms would have also been remodeled and the carousel moved to make way for a new stage and entertainment area although these plans were never fully realized. On September 29, 2017, CRM Properties announced that they had abandoned plans to rehabilitate the mall, and would close it permanently on 31 October 2017 with the only the tenants left an antique shop and high school space for Santa Fe South High School.

Repurposing and revival efforts (2021-present)

As of 2021, the mall is home to, in the former Montgomery Wards store, “Santa Fe South High School” for students and the former JCPenney is being used for a shop called “Crossroads Antiques & Collections” in the upper level portion while the lower level is used for miscellanies events. The rest of the in-line mall sits vacant along with the former Dillard's space.

In July 2021, it was announced that the mall was bought for $6 million dollars by Linn's Crossroads Plaza LLC. In a Facebook post announcing the sale, Paul Ravencraft and George Williams with Price Edwards said the new owner plans to repurpose the mall over the next year, with plans to be revealed at a later date. The 800,070-square-foot property consists of the in-line mall, and the former JC Penney and Dillard's spaces at 7000 Crossroads Blvd.

On January 20, 2021, the former John A. Brown, Sanger-Harris, Foley's, and Macy's spaces were Purchased by SFS DEVELOPMENT INC, to use as a automotive parts warehouse for a local dealership chain. The new owner has indicated that they plan to re-develop the building into a learning center for Children.

In October 2022, there had been reports of plans to reopen the facility, after renovations. 

In October 2022, the Oklahoma City Wranglers, a semi-pro football team in the UFL, announced it would build a temporary 8,400-seat stadium for the spring season in April, 2023. The $1.1 million dollar, open-air stadium will be built on the south side of the mall between the old J.C. Penney and Dillard's spaces.

References

Shopping malls established in 1974
Shopping malls in Oklahoma
Buildings and structures in Oklahoma City
Economy of Oklahoma City
Tourist attractions in Oklahoma City
Defunct shopping malls in the United States
1974 establishments in Oklahoma
2017 disestablishments in Oklahoma
Shopping malls disestablished in 2017